This is a list of Ministers of the Budget of France, sometimes called Minister for the Budget or Secretary of State for the Budget, since the establishment of the French Third Republic in 1870. The officeholder works closely with the Minister of the Economy and Finance, as both ministers share the same office building in Bercy.

List of officeholders
4 September 1870 – 12 January 1871: Ernest Picard
19 February 1871 – 25 February 1871: Louis Buffet
25 February 1871 – 23 April 1872: Augustin Pouyer-Quertier
23 April 1872 – 7 December 1872: Eugène de Goulard
7 December 1872 – 25 May 1873: Léon Say
25 May 1873 – 20 July 1874: Pierre Magne
20 July 1874 – 10 March 1875: Pierre Mathieu-Bodet
10 March 1875 – 17 May 1877: Léon Say
17 May 1877 – 23 November 1877: Eugène Caillaux
23 November 1877 – 13 December 1877: François-Ernest Dutilleul
13 December 1877 – 28 December 1879: Léon Say
28 December 1879 – 14 November 1881: Pierre Magnin
14 November 1881 – 30 January 1882: François Allain-Targé
30 January 1882 – 7 August 1882: Léon Say
7 August 1882 – 6 April 1885: Pierre Tirard
6 April 1885 – 16 April 1885: Jean-Jules Clamageran
16 April 1885 – 3 December 1886: Sadi Carnot
3 December 1886 – 30 May 1887: Albert Dauphin 
30 May 1887 – 11 December 1887: Maurice Rouvier
11 December 1887 – 3 April 1888: Pierre Tirard
3 April 1888 – 22 February 1889: Paul Peytral
22 February 1889 – 13 December 1892: Maurice Rouvier
13 December 1892 – 4 April 1893: Pierre Tirard 
4 April 1893 – 3 December 1893: Paul Peytral
3 December 1893 – 30 May 1894: Auguste Burdeau
30 May 1894 – 26 January 1895: Raymond Poincaré
26 January 1895 – 1 November 1895: Alexandre Ribot
1 November 1895 – 23 April 1896: Paul Doumer
23 April 1896 – 28 June 1898: Georges Cochery
28 June 1898 – 22 June 1899: Paul Peytral
22 June 1899 – 7 June 1902: Joseph Caillaux
7 June 1902 – 17 June 1905: Maurice Rouvier
17 June 1905 – 7 March 1906: Pierre Merlou
7 March 1906 – 25 October 1906: Raymond Poincaré
25 October 1906 – 24 July 1909: Joseph Caillaux
24 July 1909 – 3 November 1910: Georges Cochery
3 November 1910 – 2 March 1911: Louis-Lucien Klotz
2 March 1911 – 27 June 1911: Joseph Caillaux
27 June 1911 – 22 March 1913: Louis-Lucien Klotz
22 March 1913 – 2 December 1913: Charles Dumont
2 December 1913 – 17 March 1914: Joseph Caillaux
17 March 1914 – 9 June 1914: René Renoult
9 June 1914 – 13 June 1914: Étienne Clémentel
13 June 1914 – 26 August 1914: Joseph Noulens
26 August 1914 – 20 March 1917: Alexandre Ribot
20 March 1917 – 12 September 1917: Joseph Thierry
12 September 1917 – 20 January 1920: Louis-Lucien Klotz
20 January 1920 – 16 January 1921: Frédéric François-Marsal
16 January 1921 – 15 January 1922: Paul Doumer
15 January 1922 – 29 March 1924: Charles de Lasteyrie
29 March 1924 – 14 June 1924: Frédéric François-Marsal 
14 June 1924 – 3 April 1925: Étienne Clémentel
3 April 1925 – 17 April 1925: Anatole de Monzie
17 April 1925 – 29 October 1925: Joseph Caillaux
29 October 1925 – 28 November 1925: Georges Bonnet
21 February 1930 –  2 March 1930: Maurice Palmade
2 March 1930 – 13 December 1930: Louis Germain-Martin
13 December 1930 – 27 January 1931: Maurice Palmade
27 January 1931 – 20 February 1932: François Piétri
3 June 1932 – 18 December 1932: Maurice Palmade
31 January 1933 – 26 October 1933: Lucien Lamoureux
26 October 1933 – 26 November 1933: Abel Gardey
26 November 1933 – 30 January 1934: Paul Marchandeau
13 March 1938 – 10 April 1938: Charles Spinasse
2 July 1950 – 11 August 1951: Edgar Faure
11 August 1951 –  8 March 1952: Pierre Courant
8 January 1953 – 21 May 1953: Jean Moreau
18 July 1953 – 3 September 1954: Jean Ulven
31 January 1956 – 21 May 1957: Jean Filippi
17 June 1957 – 28 June 1958: Jean Guyon
11 September 1962 – 8 April 1967: Robert Boulin
7 January 1971 – 5 April 1973: Jean Taittinger
23 October 1973 – 27 May 1974: Henri Torre
28 May 1974 – 29 March 1977: Christian Poncelet
5 April 1978 – 22 May 1981: Maurice Papon
22 May 1981 – 23 March 1983: Laurent Fabius
23 March 1983 – 19 July 1984: Henri Emmanuelli
19 July 1984 – 20 March 1986: Pierre Bérégovoy
20 March 1986 – 10 May 1988: Alain Juppé
10 May 1988 – 22 June 1988: Pierre Bérégovoy
22 June 1988 –  2 October 1992: Michel Charasse
2 October 1992 – 28 March 1993: Martin Malvy
29 March 1993 – 17 May 1995: Nicolas Sarkozy
17 May 1995 – 7 November 1995: François d'Aubert
7 November 1995 – 2 June 1997: Alain Lamassoure
4 June 1997 – 2 November 1999: Christian Sautter
3 January 2000 – 6 May 2002: Florence Parly
7 May 2002 – 30 March 2004: Alain Lambert
30 March 2004 – 31 May 2005: Dominique Bussereau
31 May 2005 – 15 May 2007: Jean-François Copé
18 May 2007 –  22 March 2010: Éric Woerth
22 March 2010 – 29 June 2011: François Baroin
29 June 2011 – 10 May 2012: Valérie Pécresse
16 May 2012 – 19 March 2013: Jérôme Cahuzac
19 March 2013 – 31 March 2014: Bernard Cazeneuve
9 April 2014 – 10 May 2017: Christian Eckert
17 May 2017 – 6 July 2020: Gérald Darmanin
6 July 2020 – Present: Olivier Dussopt

Budget
Budget
 
Budget Ministers